The 1989 WAFL season was the 105th season of senior football in Perth. It saw Claremont continue its dominance of the competition with a third successive minor premiership under Gerard Neesham, despite having lost most of their top players of previous seasons to the VFL, and their 1988 conquerors Subiaco fall to third last with a mere six wins – their worst performance since the dark days of 1983 when the club had not played in the finals for nine years and had been wooden spooners four times in eight seasons. Coach Bunton had to promote many young players and knew 1989 was to be a year of rebuilding, though only a second (and last as of 2014) Colts premiership under Eddie Pitter showed Subiaco did possess much resilience.

Perth, who in 1988 had had their best record since 1978 and returned to Lathlain Park after the experiment of playing at their pre-1959 home of the WACA Ground was regarded as a financial failure, were also severely disappointing. Swan Districts, who in 1988 had become the first club to suffer the ignominy of being last in all three grades, rebounded so well despite the absence of Narkle that after thirteen rounds they were certainties for the four before a run of wins by West Perth coincided with a Swan slump and allowed the Falcons to reach the finals for only the third time in eleven seasons.

The season saw two experimental matches played in outer suburbs so that the WAFL could assess the possibility of relocating financially crippled Perth and West Perth to the Perth Hills and the growing northwestern corridor respectively. The former move never occurred due to dissent within the committee, the latter did however five years subsequently.

Another first was the semi-finals double-header that was to become standard in the league during the 1990s, instigated due to the only senior finals tie since the 1938 Grand Final and the refusal of Claremont and South Fremantle to accept two weekends without a match. Although a game on Saturday and one on Sunday was proposed, the first semi-final replay was ultimately played before the second semi on the Saturday. There were also suggestions for the first time of the WAFL expanding beyond Perth to such rural centres as Bunbury and Geraldton and that established Perth clubs merge in order to adapt to the new realities of a national VFL/AFL competition.

A more pressing issue was the off-field debate between Indian Pacific (the holders of the Eagles’ VFL licence) and the WAFL over the running of football in Western Australia, with Indian Pacific demanding an independent West Australian Football Commission rather than one controlled by the WAFL which was felt to be depressing standards. The dispute after the VFL allowed the Eagles to field a reserves team in exchange for a larger list continued: the VFL wanted the Eagles’ reserves playing in the VFL/AFL reserve grade competition, but that was unacceptable to the WAFC due to the cost of moving extra players to Melbourne, whilst the WAFC's preferred option of an Eagle reserves team in the WAFL was not acceptable to WAFL club executives as it would upset the tried-and-proved WAFL structure.

Home-and-away season

Round 1

Round 2

Round 3

Round 4

Round 5

Round 6

Round 7

Round 8

Round 9 (Foundation Day)

Round 10

Round 11

Round 12

Round 13

Round 14

Round 15

Round 16

Round 17

Round 18

Round 19

Round 20

Round 21

Ladder

Finals

Semi-finals

Preliminary final

Grand Final

Notes
The only other clubs to finish last in all three grades since 1957 have been Peel Thunder in their inaugural 1997 season and West Perth in 1992. No club has won premierships in all three grades in this time span.As with the AFL, WAFL/Westar semi- and preliminary finals have since 1991 been required to play extra time if drawn at full-time, though this has never actually occurred.At the Albany match the attendance figure did not include children under fifteen years of age who were admitted free of charge.At that time, Bill was president of the Swan Districts Football Club, a position he held from 1983 to 1994

References

External links
Official WAFL website
West Australian Football League Season 1989

West Australian Football League seasons
WAFL